The Greater London Group (now LSE London) was a research centre at the London School of Economics that was created in 1958 and focused on issues of London government. It has been recognised as having had a significant impact during the 1960s and upon the creation of the Greater London Council in 1965.

History

It was founded by Professor William A. Robson (1895–1980) and consisted of a group of academics at the London School of Economics (LSE) led by Robson. Its creation reflected interest in what direction the growing metropolis would go in and debates about what form government in London should take.  Early members of the group came from a variety of disciplines, including social administration expert David Donnison, geographer Michael Wise, political scientist Richard Pear, and scholar of public administration Peter Self.  The group carried out an extensive survey on local government in London, which was then drawn upon by the Royal Commission on Local Government in Greater London. In 1959 the group put forth a Memorandum of Evidence in an attempt to define an area that would form a central London borough.

Robson kept the group going after the commission report, to study what happened next.  By 1960, the group had, as one later account wrote, "earned a reputation as the leading centre for the study of London government".  By 1963, it had more than a dozen members, who held a variety of views.  The group met every Monday afternoon to review and discuss papers or hear from visiting speakers.  Its offices tended to move around a lot, but included a stint in LSE's Old Building.

The group's members also were significantly overlapped with those of the Town and Country Planning Association, which in part added to the group's effectiveness.
Indeed, the group has been recognised as having had a significant impact upon efforts to reform London government during the 1960s and upon the creation of the Greater London Council in 1965.  Later members in the group included the likes of Jeffrey Jowell and Peter Hall.  The group also had a number of research officers attached to it, who authored reports and some of whom, like Ken Young, went on to prominent academic careers of their own.

Leadership
Robson was the main leader of the group until his death in 1980.  Following that, the group was led by Self, and then after that, in a co-chair arrangement, by Derek Diamond and George W. Jones. Diamond retired from the LSE and also stepped down as chair of the Group in 1995. Later, the director of the group became Tony Travers, under whose leadership the group became more active and visible.

LSE London
Out of the Greater London Group, LSE London was then established in 1998, as a research group hosted by the Department of Geography and Environment of the London School of Economics. Travers, the former director of the Greater London Group has then become director of LSE London  since its establishment, as mentioned on LSE London website. However, the Greater London Group was still recognised under its name in newspaper stories as late as 2009 and 2010 and 2012.  

Today, LSE London conducts research on the economic and social issues that affect the London region and has gained a strong international reputation particularly in the fields of social and demographic change, housing, finance and governance, becoming the leading academic group at the London School of Economics for analyses of city-wide developments in London.

References 

London School of Economics
1958 establishments in England
Research organisations in England
Defunct organisations based in London